Robert Stanley Fitzsimmons (16 April 1917 – 21 April 1998) was an Australian rules footballer who played with Fitzroy and St Kilda in the Victorian Football League (VFL).

Notes

External links 
		

1917 births
Australian rules footballers from Victoria (Australia)
Fitzroy Football Club players
St Kilda Football Club players
1998 deaths